The 2018–19 Club Puebla season is the club's 72nd professional season in Mexico's top-flight football league. The season is split into two tournaments—the Torneo Apertura and the Torneo Clausura—each with identical formats and each contested by the same eighteen teams. The club will also play Copa MX.

Coaching staff

Players

Squad information

Players and squad numbers last updated on 6 January 2019.Note: Flags indicate national team as has been defined under FIFA eligibility rules. Players may hold more than one non-FIFA nationality.

Competitions

Overview

Torneo Apertura

League table

Matches

Apertura Copa MX

Group stage

Knockout phase

Round of 16

Torneo Clausura

League table

Results summary

Result round by round

Matches

Clausura Copa MX

Group stage

Statistics

Goals

Clean sheets

Attendance
Puebla's Home Attendance by round, Estadio Cuauhtémoc has a capacity of 51,726.

References

Puebla F.C. seasons